Fruit Chan Gor (born 15 April 1959) is a Hong Kong filmmaker who is best known for his style of film reflecting the everyday life of Hong Kong people. He is well known for using amateur actors (such as Sam Lee in Made in Hong Kong, Wong Yau-Nam in Hollywood Hong Kong) in his films. He became a household name after the success of the 1997 film Made in Hong Kong, which earned many local and international awards.

Early life
Chan was born in Guangdong, China. Growing up, he watched a lot of films from Communist countries.

He and his family moved to Hong Kong in July 1971. His family was poor and Chan worked in an electronics factory while finishing Forms 1 to 3 at night school. He later got a job as a projectionist in Jordan, Hong Kong, where he developed an interest in international cinema.

He later enrolled in a one-year film studies course at the Film Culture Society, garnering admission by lying about his secondary education experience and working odd jobs to pay for tuition.

Career 
He continued his interest in film later on at the Hong Kong Film Culture Centre, a small film club, where he studied script writing and directing. In 1982, after only one year of working at the Hong Kong Film Culture Centre he started his career in the film industry. He began his career as an assistant director to David Lai Dai-Wai in the film Mid-Night Girls. He later worked as an assistant director to mainstream directors Jackie Chan, Kirk Wong, Ronny Yu, and Shu Kei.

His break came in 1991 when a film he was working with stopped its production. Chan took this as an opportunity; he used the same studio to direct Finale in Blood starring Hong Kong film star Andy Lau. However, the outcome of the first of his own films was highly praised by the critics rather than the public. In 1994 he collected a total of 500,000 HKD and film-materials left over by other productions to begin directing his award winning Made in Hong Kong. After Made in Hong Kong came out he was thought of as the hope for Hong Kong cinema by fellow Hong Kong filmmakers for challenging the stable model of Hong Kong filmmaking. He had become the first filmmaker to, independently of the big studios, challenge the genre of Hong Kong films and make realistic films about the political and social situations going on in Hong Kong at the time. The film was the first part to a trilogy that included The Longest Summer and Little Cheung.

In 2002, Chan was a member of the jury at the 24th Moscow International Film Festival.

Chan was selected to head the jury for the 2015 Taipei Film Festival.

Style and influences 
Chan lists Japanese directors, particularly from the 1960s such as Nagisa Ōshima, as his primary influences. Ōshima specifically was the influence for Chan's film Made in Hong Kong (1997).

Chan's films often focus on the "raw, often bleak, view of life of Hong Kong's working class."

Filmography

As director

 Finale in Blood (大鬧廣昌隆) (1993)
 The 1997 Trilogy (九七三部曲) (referring to the year of Hong Kong's handover to the People's Republic of China)
 Made in Hong Kong (香港製造) (1997)
 The Longest Summer (去年煙花特別多) (1998)
 Little Cheung (細路祥) (1999)
 The Prostitute Trilogy (妓女三部曲)
 Durian Durian (榴槤飄飄) (2000)
 Hollywood Hong Kong (香港有個荷里活) (2001)
 Three Husbands (三夫) (2018)
 Public Toilet (人民公廁) (2002)
 Three... Extremes (三更2) (2004) – segment "Dumplings"
 Dumplings (餃子) (2004)
 Chengdu, I Love You (2009) – segment "1976"
 Don't Look Up (2009), a remake of the 1996 Japanese horror film Don't Look Up
 Tales from the Dark 1 (2013) – segment Jing Zhe
 The Midnight After (2014)
 Kill Time (2016)
 The Abortionist (墮胎師) (2019)
 Coffin Homes (2021)

As scriptwriter

 Bugis Street (1995)
 The 1997 Trilogy 九七三部曲
 Little Cheung 細路祥 (1999)
 The Longest Summer 去年煙花特別多 (1998)
 Made in Hong Kong 香港製造 (1997)
 The Prostitute Trilogy 妓女三部曲
 Hollywood Hong Kong 香港有個荷里活 (2001)
 Durian Durian 榴槤飄飄 (2000)
 Public Toilet 人民公廁 (2002)

As producer

 Public Toilet 人民公廁 (2002)
 Colour Blossoms 桃色 (2004)
 A-1 Headline (2004)
 Bliss (2006)
 Still Human 淪落人 (2019)

As actor
 Mrs K (2016)

References

External links

 HK cinemagic entry
 loveHKfilm entry
 Fruit Chan : the Career Interview
Interview with Pang Ho-cheung

1959 births
Living people
Hong Kong film directors
Hong Kong screenwriters
Hong Kong film producers
Horror film directors